, (born 24 October 1947 in Osaka) is a Japanese former rugby union player and coach. He played as a fly-half.

Career
Hailing from Osaka Prefecture, Koyabu was educated at Doshisha University, where he was the driving force of the West League consecutive wins as the team captain. In 1970 after graduation, he worked for Mitsubishi Motors Kyoto, but he joined Nippon Steel Kamaishi, with which he would win several times the Kansai League A and the 1977 All Japan Championship, as player-coach. In that year, Koyabu retired as player and he led Nippon Steel Kamaishi between 1976 and 1981, during the club's seven consecutive titles in the All-Japan Championship. 
In 1974, Koyabu was called up by the then-coach of the Japanese national team Ryo Saito to play for Japan, with which Koyabu only played a test match against Sri Lanka, in Colombo, scoring a try in the match, winning the 4th edition of the Asia Rugby Championship.  
In 1992, Koyabu returned to the Japan national rugby union team, being appointed as head coach, replacing Hiroaki Shukuzawa. 
Currently, Koyabu works in a company affiliated to Nippon Steel.

Notes

External links

1947 births
Living people
Japanese rugby union players
Japanese rugby union coaches
Rugby union fly-halves
Rugby union coaches
Sportspeople from Osaka Prefecture
Japan international rugby union players
Kamaishi Seawaves players